Consul fabius, the tiger leafwing, is the most common and well known species of the genus Consul of subfamily Charaxinae in the brush-footed butterfly family (Nymphalidae). It is found all over the Neotropics.

Description

The uppersides of the wings have a bright orange and black pattern, with two yellow bands across the angular forewings. The hindwings are tailed. This butterfly is part of a mimicry ring, as a matter of fact the cryptic undersides of the wings mimic a dead leaf. The eggs are laid on the leaves of various species of Piperaceae (Piper tuberculatum, Piper auritum, Piper umbellatum, etc.), of which the caterpillars feed. The caterpillars are dark green with reddish spots along the back, while the chrysalis are pale green.

Distribution
Consul fabius occurs from Mexico to the Amazon basin (Bolivia, Brazil, Colombia, Ecuador, Mexico, Panama, Peru, Suriname, Trinidad, Venezuela).

Habitat
This species is present in deciduous forest, rainforest, and cloud forest. It usually prefers the forest canopy, the banks of rivers and the forest edges, at elevations between sea level and about 1200 m.

Subspecies

C. f. fabius (Suriname)
C. f. cecrops (Doubleday, [1849]) (Mexico, Panama to Bolivia)
C. f. albinotatus (Butler, 1874) (Colombia)
C. f. bogotanus (Butler, 1874) (Columbia, Venezuela)
C. f. castaneus (Butler, 1874) (Brazil: Amazonas)
C. f. drurii (Butler, 1874) (Brazil)
C. f. divisus (Butler, 1874) (Peru)
C. f. ochraceus (Butler, 1874) (Trinidad)
C. f. quadridentatus (Butler, 1874) (Bolivia)
C. f. fulvus (Butler, 1875) (Peru)
C. f. diffusus (Butler, 1875) (Ecuador)
C. f. semifulvus (Butler, 1875) (Ecuador)
C. f. fassli (Röber, 1916) (western Colombia, Ecuador)
C. f. superba (Niepelt, 1923) (Colombia)

Synonyms
 Papilio fabius Cramer, [1775]
 Consul hippona
 Anaea fabius
 Protogonius quadridentatus = C. f. quadridentatus (Butler, 1874)
 Protogonius castaneus = C. f. castaneus (Butler, 1874)
 Protogonius ochraceus = C. f. ochraceus (Butler, 1874)
 Protogonius albinotatus = C. f. albinotatus (Butler, 1874)
 Protogonius cecrops Doubleday, [1849]
 Protogonius hippona chiricanus Röber, 1916
 Protogonius tithoreides Butler, 1874
 Protogonius lilops Butler, 1874
 Protogonius holocrates Hahnel, 1890
 Protogonius hippona var. immaculatus Staudinger, 1887
 Protogonius hippona var. peruvianus Staudinger, 1887
 Protogonius hippona trinitatis Röber, 1916
 Protogonius butleri Staudinger, 1886
 Protogonius aequatorialis Butler, 1875
 Protogonius diffusus ab. ecuadorensis Strand, 1921

References

External links
Butterflies of Amazonia
Neotropical Butterflies
Tolweb

Anaeini
Butterflies of North America
Nymphalidae of South America
Butterflies described in 1776
Fauna of Brazil
Taxa named by Pieter Cramer